Parteek Dahiya (born 11 June 2002) is an Indian kabaddi player who currently plays for Gujarat Giants in VIVO Pro Kabaddi league. Dahiya was picked up by Gujarat Giants in the Season 9 auction. In VIVO Pro Kabaddi Season 9, Dahiya score 183 points and get 6th place in top 10 ten raider of pkl season 9.

Early life 

Parteek Dahiya was born in Sonipat district of Haryana. His father is a farmer and mother a homemaker. Prateek started playing Kabaddi inspired by his maternal uncle Deepak Niwas Hooda. His sister Preeti Dahiya is an international level boxer. His maternal uncle Deepak Niwas Hooda is an international Kabaddi player and has also captained the Indian Kabaddi team. His maternal aunt Sweety Boora is also an international boxer.

Kabaddi career 

Parteek Dahiya was bought by Patana pairets in PKL season 8 auction but he did not get a chance to play any match. He Scored 250 points leading his maternal uncle's team Deepak Niwas Hooda Foundation in the 2022 k7 kabaddi league. In pkl season 9 playing for Gujarat giants he scored total 183 points in 19 matches with 178 raid points and 5 tackles.

References 

2002 births
Living people
Indian kabaddi players
Pro Kabaddi League players
People from Sonipat district